Rhagovelia vega is a species of aquatic bug first found in Vereda La Vega, Oporapa, Huila, Colombia.

References

Veliidae
Hemiptera of South America
Insects described in 2011